This chart shows historical information on the salaries that members of the United States Congress have been paid. The  Government Ethics Reform Act of 1989 provides for an automatic increase in salary each year as a cost of living adjustment that reflects the employment cost index. Since 2010 Congress has annually voted not to accept the increase, keeping it at the same nominal amount since 2009. The Twenty-seventh Amendment to the United States Constitution, ratified in 1992, prohibits any law affecting compensation from taking effect until after the next election.

For all members of the House of Representatives and Senate

Leadership and other positions 
Additional pay schedule for the Senate and House positions:

SCHEDULE 6—VICE PRESIDENT AND MEMBERS OF CONGRESS, per Executive order 13970, effective for 2021.

References

Members of the United States Congress
United States Congress
US Congress

https://www.senate.gov/CRSpubs/9c14ec69-c4e4-4bd8-8953-f73daa1640e4.pdf